Brewerton is a census-designated place (CDP) in the town of Cicero in Onondaga County and the town of Hastings in Oswego County in the U.S. state of New York. It lies at the west end of Oneida Lake at its outlet into the Oneida River. The population was 4,029 at the 2010 census. Maps of the 19th century  indicate that this area was once known as Fort Brewerton, while Brewerton meant the Cicero portion.

History 

The community is sited near the former Fort Brewerton, erected in 1759 to defend the passage from Albany to the port of Oswego. Settlers arrived in 1789 to engage in the fur trade. The Fort Brewerton Block House Museum contains local relics dating back to Paleo-Indian times. It is located next to the original fort.

In the late 18th century two Presbyterians, Rev. John Shepard and Deacon George Ramsey started preaching in the area near the Fort Brewerton embankment. Deacon Ramsey built a schoolhouse nearby which was used for both instruction and worship.

In 1948 the Brewerton Speedway was built by Alvin Richardson of Buffalo as a 1/4 mile dirt track. Brewerton was working on another track however production has stopped due to state funding.

Fort Brewerton was listed on the National Register of Historic Places in 1973.

Geography
Brewerton is located at  (43.237428, -76.139369) on the Oneida River on the west end of Oneida Lake.

According to the United States Census Bureau, the CDP has a total area of 3.3 square miles (8.6 km2), of which 3.2 square miles (8.2 km2)  is land and 0.2 square mile (0.4 km2)  (5.11%) is water.

Brewerton has the largest elementary school in the Central Square School District, which is the geographically one of the largest school districts in the State of New York. 

Both U.S. Route 11 and Interstate 81 pass through the hamlet, connecting it to Watertown to the north and Syracuse to the south. In April 2007, the Town of Cicero redrew the traditional boundaries of Brewerton, moving the eastern line west to Interstate 81, and the southern line northward from Mudmill Road to Orangeport Road. This was done to allow Brewerton to remain eligible for Federal grant money. New housing developments had made Brewerton exceed guidelines for "blighted" areas that allow for improvement funds.

In recent years, Brewerton has become a major port for fishing on the already popular Oneida Lake. This is due to the recent Bass Masters outings at Oneida Shores County Park.

Brewerton is now a center in the growth of housing developments Miralago and Champlain at the lake.

Demographics

As of the census of 2010, there were 4,029 people, 1,644 households, and 1,033 families residing in the CDP. The population density was 1,429 per square mile (421.9/km2). The racial makeup of the CDP was 95.30% White, 1.3% African American, 0.60% Native American, 0.80% Asian, 0.20% from other races, and 1.8% from two or more races. Hispanic or Latino of any race were 1.50% of the population.

There was 1,644 households, out of which 37.6% had children under the age of 18 living with them, 46.8% were married couples living together, 5.2% had a male householder with no wife present, 13.9% had a female householder with no husband present, and 34.1% were non-families. 26.0% of all households were made up of invidividuals. The average household size was 2.45 and the average family size was 2.96.

In the CDP, the population was spread out, with 28.1% under the age of 19, 12.4% from 20 to 29, 14.1% from 30 to 39, 19.9% from 40 to 49, 17.7% from 50 to 64 and 10.8% who were 65 years of age or older. The median age for males was 36.5 years, and for females the median age was 37.3 years.

From 2010 to 2014 the median income for a household in the CDP was $56,143, and the median income for a family was $69,038. Male workers had a median income of $39,943 versus $27,632 for female workers. The per capita income for the CDP was $25,318. About 11.98% of families and 16.62% of the population were below the poverty line.

References

External links
 Northern Onondaga Public Library, with Brewerton branch
  RW&O Railroad, Brewerton, NY
 Fort Brewerton Historical Society
 "Tocqueville in Fort Brewerton", segment from C-SPAN's Alexis de Tocqueville Tour

Census-designated places in New York (state)
Syracuse metropolitan area
Census-designated places in Oswego County, New York
Census-designated places in Onondaga County, New York